War Rule may refer to:
 The War of the Sons of Light Against the Sons of Darkness, a Dead Sea Scroll text and a military organization and strategy manual
 The War of the Messiah, a Dead Sea Scroll text found in manuscripts 4Q285 and 11Q14